February 24 - Eastern Orthodox liturgical calendar - February 26

All fixed commemorations below are observed on March 10 (March 9 on leap years) by Eastern Orthodox Churches on the Old Calendar.

For February 25th, Orthodox Churches on the Old Calendar commemorate the Saints listed on February 12.

Saints

 Martyr Alexander, at Marcianopolis in Thracia (c. 305)
 Martyr Anthony, by being burned alive. 
 Saint Theodore, Fool-for-Christ.
 Hieromartyr Reginus of Skopelos, Bishop of the isle of Skopelos (355)
 Saint Marcellus, Bishop of Aipeia in Cyprus.
 Venerable Paphnutius of Kephala, monk, contemporary of St. Anthony the Great (4th century)
 Saint Tarasius of Constantinople, Patriarch of Constantinople (806)

Pre-Schism Western saints

 Saints Donatus, Justus, Herena and Companions, a group of fifty martyrs who suffered in North Africa under Decius (3rd century)
 Saint Ethelbert, King of Kent (616)
 Saint Aldetrudis (Adeltrudis) of Maubeuge Abbey (c. 696)
 Saint Walburga, Abbess of Heidenheim (779)
 Saint Victor of St. Gall, a monk at St Gall in Switzerland who became a hermit in the Vosges in France where he reposed (995)

Post-Schism Orthodox saints

—

New martyrs and confessors

 New Hieromartyr Sylvester (Olshevsky), Archbishop of Omsk and Pavlodar (1920) (see also: July 3)
 New Hieromartyr Alexander Vinogradov, Priest (1938)
 Virgin-Martyr Mstislava Fokinoi (1938)
 New Hieromartyr Leo Korobczuk, Priest, of Laskov (Chełm and Podlasie), Poland (1944)
 New Hieromartyr Nicholas Troitsky, Priest (1945)

Other commemorations

 Repose of Blessed Pashenka of Nizhny Novgorod (1934)

Icon gallery

Notes

References

Sources
 February 25 / March 10. Orthodox Calendar (Pravoslavie.ru).
 March 10 / February 25. Holy Trinity Russian Orthodox Church (A parish of the Patriarchate of Moscow).
 February 25. OCA - The Lives of the Saints.
 The Autonomous Orthodox Metropolia of Western Europe and the Americas. St. Hilarion Calendar of Saints for the year of our Lord 2004. St. Hilarion Press (Austin, TX). p. 17.
 The Twenty-Fifth Day of the Month of February. Orthodoxy in China.
 February 25. Latin Saints of the Orthodox Patriarchate of Rome.
 The Roman Martyrology. Transl. by the Archbishop of Baltimore. Last Edition, According to the Copy Printed at Rome in 1914. Revised Edition, with the Imprimatur of His Eminence Cardinal Gibbons. Baltimore: John Murphy Company, 1916. pp. 58.
 Rev. Richard Stanton. A Menology of England and Wales, or, Brief Memorials of the Ancient British and English Saints Arranged According to the Calendar, Together with the Martyrs of the 16th and 17th Centuries. London: Burns & Oates, 1892. p. 84-85.
Greek Sources
 Great Synaxaristes:  25 ΦΕΒΡΟΥΑΡΙΟΥ. Μεγασ Συναξαριστησ.
  Συναξαριστής. 25 Φεβρουαρίου. Ecclesia.gr. (H Εκκλησια τησ Ελλαδοσ). 
Russian Sources
  10 марта (25 февраля). Православная Энциклопедия под редакцией Патриарха Московского и всея Руси Кирилла (электронная версия). (Orthodox Encyclopedia - Pravenc.ru).
  25 февраля (ст.ст.) 10 марта 2014 (нов. ст.). Русская Православная Церковь Отдел внешних церковных связей. (DECR).

February in the Eastern Orthodox calendar